National Tertiary Route 747, or just Route 747 (or ) is a National Road Route of Costa Rica, located in the Alajuela province.

Description
In Alajuela province the route covers San Carlos canton (Aguas Zarcas, La Palmera districts).

References

Highways in Costa Rica